Clark-Miller Roller Mill, also known as the Davis-Clark Roller Mill and W.M. Miller Roller Mill, is a historic roller mill located near Lansing, Ashe County, North Carolina. It was built about 1915, and is a two- to three-story, banked frame with weatherboard siding and a metal roof. It rests on a poured concrete foundation and has a side-gabled roof. The building houses an Anglo-American (Midget) Marvel brand roller mill.

It was listed on the National Register of Historic Places in 2014.

References 

Grinding mills on the National Register of Historic Places in North Carolina
Grinding mills in North Carolina
Industrial buildings completed in 1915
Buildings and structures in Ashe County, North Carolina
National Register of Historic Places in Ashe County, North Carolina